The Journal of Inherited Metabolic Disease is a bimonthly peer-reviewed medical journal covering inherited metabolic disorders. It was established in 1978 and is the official journal of the Society for the Study of Inborn Errors of Metabolism.

External links 
 
 Society for the Study of Inborn Errors of Metabolism

Publications established in 1978
Medical genetics journals
Wiley-Blackwell academic journals
Bimonthly journals
English-language journals